Rob Verbakel (born 13 May 1987 in Nelson, New Zealand) is a Netherlands international rugby union player. He plays as a lock. He is currently playing in the Dutch league Ereklasse for RC 't Gooi.
He previously played  for Glasgow Warriors in the Pro12; and in the English league Aviva Premiership for the Northampton Saints.

Rugby Union career

Professional career

New Zealand

A late starter to rugby, Verbakel only started playing at university at age 19. However, he quickly showed his talent and after only 3 years of playing at lock was selected to the Canterbury squad for the 2010 ITM Cup, making 9 appearances.

For the 2011 ITM Cup, Verbakel transferred to Otago. He made his debut in the season-opener against North Harbour, coming off the bench for the 2nd half and scoring his first provincial try.

After a stint in Scotland, he returned to Otago for the 2012 ITM Cup, and started 11 matches for the province.

Europe

Verbakel signed in Scotland with Glasgow Warriors of the Pro12 for the 2011-12 season. He made 10 appearances for the side including 6 starts before returning to New Zealand.

For the 2013-14 season, Verbakel signed with Northampton Saints, signing for the club at the same time as Otago teammate Glenn Dickson.

He is currently playing in the Dutch Ereklasse (top league) for t’ Gooi.

International career

He made his international debut for the Netherlands on 5 November 2016 against Ukraine.

References

External links
 Otago Profile

1987 births
Living people
Rugby union locks
Dutch rugby union players
New Zealand rugby union players
New Zealand people of Dutch descent
Otago rugby union players
Glasgow Warriors players
Expatriate rugby union players in Scotland
New Zealand expatriate sportspeople in Scotland
Netherlands international rugby union players
Rugby union players from Nelson, New Zealand